The following is an alphabetical list of articles related to the U.S. state of Montana.

0–9 

.mt.us – Internet second-level domain for the state of Montana
3-7-77
7th Cavalry Regiment
27th meridian west from Washington
34th meridian west from Washington
39th meridian west from Washington
45th parallel north
46th parallel north
47th parallel north
48th parallel north
49th parallel north
105th meridian west
106th meridian west
107th meridian west
108th meridian west
109th meridian west
110th meridian west
111th meridian west
112th meridian west
113th meridian west
114th meridian west
115th meridian west
116th meridian west

A
Absaroka-Beartooth Wilderness
Adjacent states and provinces:

Agriculture in Montana
Agropyron spicatum
Airports in Montana
 Amphibians and reptiles of Montana
Anaconda-Pintler Wilderness
Arboreta in Montana
commons:Category:Arboreta in Montana
Archaeology of Montana
:Category:Archaeological sites in Montana
commons:Category:Archaeological sites in Montana
Architecture of Montana
Area codes in Montana
Art museums and galleries in Montana
commons:Category:Art museums and galleries in Montana
Artists of Montana

B

Baldwin v. Fish and Game Commission of Montana
Bannack, Montana Territory, first territorial capital 1864-1865
Battle of Bear Paw
Battle of Canyon Creek
Battle of Cedar Creek
Battle of Powder River
Battle of the Big Hole
Battle of the Little Bighorn
Battle of the Rosebud
Battle of Wolf Mountain
Beaverhead-Deerlodge National Forest
Beaverhead Rock
Benton Lake National Wildlife Refuge
Benton Lake Wetland Management District
Big Hole National Battlefield
Big Sky Country
Bike paths in Montana
Billings, Montana
Billings Symphony Orchestra
Bison Range
Bitterroot
Bitterroot Mountains
Bitterroot National Forest
Bitterroot Valley
Black Coulee National Wildlife Refuge
Black Hills War
Blackfeet Indian Reservation
Blackspotted Cutthroat Trout
Bluebunch Wheatgrass
Bob Marshall Wilderness Complex
Bob Marshall Wilderness
Botanical gardens in Montana
commons:Category:Botanical gardens in Montana
Bowdoin National Wildlife Refuge
Bozeman Trail
Bridges on the National Register of Historic Places in Montana
Buildings and structures in Montana
commons:Category:Buildings and structures in Montana

C

Cabinet Mountains Wilderness
Capital of the state of Montana
Capitol of the State of Montana
Caves of Montana
commons:Category:Caves of Montana
Census Designated Places in Montana
Census statistical areas in Montana
Charles M. Russell National Wildlife Refuge
Charles M. Russell National Wildlife Refuge Complex
Chief Joseph
Chief Plenty Coups (Alek-Chea-Ahoosh) State Park and Home
Cities and towns in Montana
Cities in Montana
Towns in Montana
 Clams and Mussels of Montana
Clark, William
Climate of Montana
Climate change in Montana 
Club-mosses and Mosses of Montana
Colleges and universities in Montana
Columbia Basin
Communications in Montana
commons:Category:Communications in Montana
Companies based in Montana
Confederate Gulch and Diamond City
Constitution of the State of Montana
Counties of the state of Montana
commons:Category:Counties in Montana
Counties of Montana ranked by per capita income
Crazy Horse
Crazy Mountains
Crazy Peak
Creedman Coulee National Wildlife Refuge
Crow Nation
Crustaceans of Montana
Culture of Montana
commons:Category:Montana culture
Custer, George Armstrong
Custer National Forest

D
Dams in Montana
Demographics of Montana
Diamond City
Dicotyledons of Montana
District of Louisiana
Duck-billed Dinosaur
Dull Knife Fight

E

Economy of Montana
:Category:Economy of Montana
commons:Category:Economy of Montana
Education in Montana
:Category:Education in Montana
commons:Category:Education in Montana
Elections in Montana
commons:Category:Montana elections
Electric Peak
Environment of Montana
commons:Category:Environment of Montana

F

Fauna of Montana
Federal highways in Montana
Fictional characters from Montana
Films set in Montana
Films shot in Montana
 Fish of Montana
Flag of the State of Montana
Flathead Indian Reservation
Flathead Lake
Flathead National Forest
Flora of Montana
 Forests in Montana
Fort Belknap Indian Reservation
Fort Peck Indian Reservation
Forts in Montana
:Category:Forts in Montana
commons:Category:Forts in Montana

G

Gallatin National Forest
Gates of the Mountains Wilderness
Geography of Montana
:Category:Geography of Montana
commons:Category:Geography of Montana
Geology of Montana
Geology of the Rocky Mountains
commons:Category:Geology of Montana
Ghost towns in Montana
:Category:Ghost towns in Montana
commons:Category:Ghost towns in Montana
Giant Springs
Glaciers of Montana
commons:Category:Glaciers of Montana
Government of the state of Montana  website
Constitution of the State of Montana
:Category:Government of Montana
commons:Category:Government of Montana
Governor of the State of Montana
Governor's Residence of Montana
List of governors of Montana
Glacial Lake Missoula
Glacier National Park
Glaciers in Montana
Granite Peak
Grant-Kohrs Ranch National Historic Site
Grass Lake National Wildlife Refuge
Great Bear Wilderness
Great Falls, Montana
Great Falls of the Missouri River
Great Seal of the State of Montana
Grizzly bear

H
Hailstone National Wildlife Refuge
Helena, Montana, territorial and state capital since 1875
Helena National Forest
Hewitt Lake National Wildlife Refuge
High schools in Montana
Highway Patrol of Montana
Highways in Montana
Hiking trails in Montana
commons:Category:Hiking trails in Montana
History of Montana
Historical outline of Montana
Hot springs of Montana
commons:Category:Hot springs of Montana
House of Representatives of the State of Montana
Montana State Representatives

I
Idaho Panhandle National Forest
Images of Montana
commons:Category:Montana
Individuals executed in Montana
Insignia of the State of Montana
Interstate Highways in Montana
Islands in Montana

J

Chief Joseph

K
Kootenai National Forest

L

Lake Mason National Wildlife Refuge
Lake Thibadeau National Wildlife Refuge
Lakes of Montana
commons:Category:Lakes of Montana
Lamesteer National Wildlife Refuge
Landforms of Montana
Landmarks in Montana
commons:Category:Landmarks in Montana
Lee Metcalf National Wildlife Refuge
Lee Metcalf Wilderness
Legislature of the State of Montana
Montana Senate
Montana House of Representatives
Lewis, Meriwether
Lewis and Clark Caverns
Lewis and Clark Expedition
Lewis and Clark National Forest
Lewis Overthrust
Lewisia rediviva
Lists related to the State of Montana:
List of amphibians and reptiles of Montana
List of airports in Montana
List of bridges on the National Register of Historic Places in Montana
List of census statistical areas in Montana
List of cities and towns in Montana
List of cities and towns along the Missouri River
List of colleges and universities in Montana
List of counties in Montana
List of Montana county seats
List of dicotyledons of Montana
List of Montana county name etymologies
List of dams and reservoirs in Montana
List of fish of Montana
List of flora and fauna of Montana
 List of forests in Montana
List of forts in Montana
List of ghost towns in Montana
List of governors of Montana
List of high schools in Montana
List of hospitals in Montana
List of individuals executed in Montana
List of islands of Montana
List of lakes in Montana
 List of Lichens of Montana
 List of mammals of Montana
List of museums in Montana
List of mountains in Montana
List of National Historic Landmarks in Montana
List of newspapers in Montana
List of non-marine molluscs of Montana
List of numbered highways in Montana
List of oil fields of Montana
List of people from Montana
List of places in Montana
List of power stations in Montana
List of radio stations in Montana
List of railroads in Montana
List of rapids in Montana
List of Registered Historic Places in Montana
List of rivers of Montana
List of state forests in Montana
List of state parks in Montana
List of state prisons in Montana
List of telephone area codes in Montana
List of television stations in Montana
List of tunnels in Montana
List of waterfalls in Montana
List of United States congressional delegations from Montana
List of United States congressional districts in Montana
List of United States representatives from Montana
List of United States senators from Montana
Mountain passes in Montana (A-L)
Mountain passes in Montana (M-Z)
Little Bighorn Battlefield National Monument
Lolo National Forest
Lost Trail National Wildlife Refuge
Louisiana Purchase of 1803

M

Maiasaura peeblesorum
Makoshika State Park
Malmstrom Air Force Base
 Mammals of Montana
Maps of Montana
commons:Category:Maps of Montana
Medicine Lake National Wildlife Refuge
Medicine Lake Wilderness
Meriwether Lewis
Metropolitan areas in Montana
Micropolitan areas in Montana
Military in Montana
Mission Mountains Wilderness
Missoula, Montana
Missouri Headwaters State Park
Missouri River
 Monocotyledons of Montana

Montana  website
:Category:Montana
commons:Category:Montana
Montana (song)
Montana 500
Montana Air National Guard
Montana Army National Guard
Montana Cost of Public Education
Montana Democratic Party
Montana Department of Transportation
Montana Dinosaur Trail
Montana Highway Patrol
Montana Legislative Referendum 121
Montana Melody
Montana Pride
Montana Republican Party
Montana State Capitol
Montana State University System
Montana Stream Access Law
Montana Television Network
Monuments and memorials in Montana
commons:Category:Monuments and memorials in Montana
Mountain passes in Montana
Mountain ranges in Montana
Mountain States
Mountains of Montana
Mount Cleveland
Mount Stimson
Mountain peaks of the Rocky Mountains
commons:Category:Mountains of Montana
Mount Ellis Academy, Bozeman, Montana
Mourning cloak
MT – United States Postal Service postal code for the State of Montana
 Mullan Road
Museums in Montana
:Category:Museums in Montana
commons:Category:Museums in Montana
Music of Montana
commons:Category:Music of Montana
:Category:Musical groups from Montana
:Category:Montana musicians

N

National Bison Range Complex
National Forests of Montana
commons:Category:National Forests of Montana
National Historic Landmarks in Montana
National Historic Sites in Montana
National Natural Landmarks in Montana
National Wilderness Areas in Montana
National Wildlife Refuges in Montana
Native Nations in Montana
Natural disasters in Montana
Natural gas pipelines in Montana
Natural history of Montana
commons:Category:Natural history of Montana
Newspapers in Montana
Nez Perce National Historic Trail
Ninepipe National Wildlife Refuge
Northwest Montana Wetland Management District
Northwestern United States
Nymphalis antiopa

O
Oncorhynchus clarki lewisi
Oregon Country
Oregon Treaty of 1846
Organizations based in Montana
Oro y Plata

P

Pablo National Wildlife Refuge
Pacific Northwest Economic Region
Parker Homestead State Park
People from Montana
:Category:People from Montana
commons:Category:People from Montana
:Category:People by city in Montana
:Category:People by county in Montana
:Category:People from Montana by occupation
Pinus ponderosa
Places in Montana ranked by per capita income
Politics of Montana
commons:Category:Politics of Montana
Pompeys Pillar National Monument
Ponderosa pine
Powder River Basin
Protected areas of Montana
commons:Category:Protected areas of Montana

R

Radio stations in Montana
Rail transport in Montana
Railroads in Montana
 Rapids in Montana
Rattlesnake National Recreation Area
Rattlesnake Wilderness
Red Cloud
Red Cloud's War
Red Rock Lakes National Wildlife Refuge
Red Rock Lakes Wilderness
Regions of Montana
 Regional designations of Montana
Registered Historic Places in Montana
Religion in Montana
:Category:Religion in Montana
commons:Category:Religion in Montana
 Reptiles of Montana
Rivers in Montana
Rocky Boy Indian Reservation
Rocky Mountain Front
Rocky Mountains

S

Sacagawea
Scapegoat Wilderness
Selway-Bitterroot Wilderness
Senate of the State of Montana
Montana State Senators
Settlements in Montana
Cities in Montana
Towns in Montana
Census Designated Places in Montana
Other unincorporated communities in Montana
List of ghost towns in Montana
List of places in Montana
Seventh Cavalry Regiment
 Simms Fishing Products
Sitting Bull
Ski areas and resorts in Montana
commons:Category:Ski areas and resorts in Montana
Solar power in Montana
Sports in Montana
:Category:Sports in Montana
commons:Category:Sports in Montana
:Category:Sports venues in Montana
commons:Category:Sports venues in Montana
Spring Meadow Lake State Park
Springs in Montana
State of Montana  website
Government of the State of Montana
:Category:Government of Montana
commons:Category:Government of Montana
State forests in Montana
State parks in Montana
State police of Montana
State prisons in Montana
Structures in Montana
commons:Category:Buildings and structures in Montana
Sturnella neglecta
 Granville Stuart
Supreme Court of the State of Montana
Swan River National Wildlife Refuge
Symbols of the State of Montana:
Montana state ballad:  "Montana Melody" website
Montana state bird:  western meadowlark (Sturnella neglecta)
Montana state butterfly:  mourning cloak (Nymphalis antiopa)
Montana state fish:  blackspotted cutthroat trout (Oncorhynchus clarki lewisi)
Montana state flag:  Flag of the State of Montana
Montana state flower:  bitterroot (Lewisia rediviva)
Montana state fossil:  duck-billed dinosaur (Maiasaura peeblesorum)
Montana state gems:  sapphire and agate
Montana state grass:  bluebunch wheatgrass (Agropyron spicatum)
Montana state mammal:  grizzly bear (Ursus arctos horribilis)
Montana state motto:  Oro y Plata (Spanish for Gold and Silver) website
Montana state nickname:  Treasure State
Montana state seal:  Great Seal of the State of Montana
Montana state slogan:  Big Sky Country
Montana state song:  "Montana"
Montana state tree:  ponderosa pine (Pinus ponderosa

T

Telecommunications in Montana
commons:Category:Communications in Montana
Telephone area codes in Montana
Television stations in Montana
Territory of Dakota, (1861–1863)-1889
Territory of Idaho, (1863–1864)-1890
Territory of Louisiana, 1805–1812
Territory of Missouri, 1812–1821
Territory of Montana, 1864–1889
Territory of Nebraska, (1854–1861)-1867
Territory of Oregon, (1848–1853)-1859
Territory of Washington, (1853–1863)-1889
Theatres in Montana
commons:Category:Theatres in Montana
 Timeline of pre-statehood Montana history
Tourism in Montana  (website)
commons:Category:Tourism in Montana
Towns and cities in Montana
Towns in Montana
Cities in Montana
Transportation in Montana
:Category:Transportation in Montana
commons:Category:Transport in Montana
Trapper Peak
Travelers' Rest State Park
Treasure State
Treaty of Fort Laramie
Tunnels in Montana
TVMT

U
UL Bend National Wildlife Refuge
UL Bend Wilderness
Unincorporated communities in Montana
United States of America
States of the United States of America
United States census statistical areas of Montana
United States congressional delegations from Montana
United States congressional districts in Montana
United States Court of Appeals for the Ninth Circuit
United States District Court for the District of Montana
United States representatives from Montana
United States senators from Montana
Universities and colleges in Montana
University of Montana System
Upper Missouri River Breaks National Monument
Ursus arctos horribilis
US-MT – ISO 3166-2:US region code for the State of Montana

V
Virginia City, Montana Territory, territorial capital 1865-1875

W

War Horse National Wildlife Refuge
Waterfalls of Montana
commons:Category:Waterfalls of Montana
Waterton-Glacier International Peace Park
Welcome Creek Wilderness
Western meadowlark
Wikimedia
Wikimedia Commons:Category:Montana
commons:Category:Maps of Montana
Wikinews:Category:Montana
Wikinews:Portal:Montana
Wikipedia Category:Montana
Wikipedia:WikiProject Montana
:Category:WikiProject Montana articles
Wikipedia:WikiProject Montana#Members
Wilderness areas of Montana
William Clark
Wind power in Montana
Wines of Montana
Writers of Montana
 Lester S. Willson

X

Y
Yellowstone National Park

Z
Zoos in Montana
commons:Category:Zoos in Montana

See also

Topic overview:
Montana
Outline of Montana

Montana
 
Montana